Good Vibes is an album by American jazz vibraphonist Johnny Lytle which was recorded in 1981 for the Muse label.

Reception

AllMusic awarded the album 3 stars with a review stating, "The ever-gregarious Johnny Lytle never cared too much for categorizing his music; he just loved to play all kinds, and this album is one of those outings".

Track listing
 "So What" (Miles Davis) - 5:56
 "Turn the Hands of Time" (Peabo Bryson) - 5:53
 "New York, New York" (Fred Ebb, John Kander) - 4:20
 "Didn't We?" (Jimmy Webb) - 5:23
 "After Supper" (Neal Hefti) - 6:06
 "Aaron's Theme" (Mike Post) - 5:14

Personnel 
Johnny Lytle - vibraphone  
Houston Person - tenor saxophone
Neal Creque - piano 
David Braham - synthesizer
Melvin Sparks - guitar
Jimmy Lewis  - bass, electric bass
Idris Muhammad - drums
Ralph Dorsey - percussion

References 

1982 albums
Johnny Lytle albums
Muse Records albums